The governor of Gibraltar is the representative of the British monarch in the British overseas territory of Gibraltar. The governor is appointed by the monarch on the advice of the British government. The role of the governor is to act as the de facto head of state. They are responsible for formally appointing the chief minister of Gibraltar, along with other members of the government of Gibraltar after a general election. The governor serves as commander-in-chief of Gibraltar's military forces and has sole responsibility for defence and security. Although recent appointments have all been former military personnel, most being former Royal Navy or Royal Marines flag officers, Sir James Dutton resigned from the role in 2015, complaining that it was "more representational and ceremonial than I had expected".

The governor has his own flag in Gibraltar, the Union Flag defaced with the territory's coat of arms. However, at the governor's official residence (The Convent), the Union Flag and the flag of Gibraltar are also flown.

List of governors of Gibraltar

(Dates in italics indicate de facto continuation of office)

See also

 The Convent
 Flag of the Governor of Gibraltar
 Chief Minister of Gibraltar

References

External links

 Governors of Gibraltar (1704–2009) at the Oxford Dictionary of National Biography

  Governor
Gibraltar-related lists